Mangelia isodoma is a species of sea snail, a marine gastropod mollusk in the family Mangeliidae.

Description
The length of the shell attains 5 mm, its diameter 2 mm.

Distribution
This marine species occurs off Lifou, New Caledonia.

References

External links
  Tucker, J.K. 2004 Catalog of recent and fossil turrids (Mollusca: Gastropoda). Zootaxa 682:1-1295.
 

isodoma
Gastropods described in 1897